Touhy may refer to:

People with the surname
John Touhy (1919–1983), American politician
Patrick L. Touhy (1839–1911), American businessman
Roger Touhy (1898–1959), Irish American mob boss

Places
Touhy Avenue, road in Illinois
Touhy, Nebraska, an unincorporated community, United States

See also
 Tuohy (disambiguation)